The 1994–95 Oklahoma State Cowboys basketball team represented Oklahoma State University as a member of the Big Eight Conference during the 1994–95 NCAA Division I men's basketball season.

Schedule and results

|-
!colspan=9 style=| Regular season

|-
!colspan=9 style=| Big Eight tournament

|-
!colspan=9 style=| NCAA tournament

NCAA tournament
West
 Oklahoma State (4) 73, Drexel (13) 49
 Oklahoma State 66, Alabama (5) 52
 Oklahoma State 71, Wake Forest (1) 66
 Oklahoma State 68, Massachusetts (2) 54
Final Four
 UCLA 74, Oklahoma State 61

Player stats

Rankings

Awards and honors
Bryant Reeves, Big 8 Player of the Year

Team players drafted into the NBA
One player from the roster was picked in an NBA draft:

References

Oklahoma State Cowboys basketball seasons
Oklahoma State
NCAA Division I men's basketball tournament Final Four seasons
1994 in sports in Oklahoma
1995 in sports in Oklahoma
Oklahoma State